The 2018–19 Texas Longhorns men's basketball team represented the University of Texas at Austin in the 2018–19 NCAA Division I men's basketball season. They were led by fourth-year head coach Shaka Smart and played their home games at the Frank Erwin Center in Austin, Texas as members of the Big 12 Conference. The team won the 2019 National Invitational Tournament with Senior Forward Dylan Osetkowski being named MVP.

Previous season
The Longhorns finished the 2017–18 season 19–15, 8–10 in Big 12 play play to finish in seventh place. They defeated Iowa State in the first round of the Big 12 tournament before losing to Texas Tech in the quarterfinals. They received an at-large bid to the NCAA tournament as the No. 10 seed in the South region where they lost to Nevada in the First Round.

Offseason

Departures

Recruits

2018 recruiting class

Roster

Depth chart

Source:

Schedule and results

|-
!colspan=9 style=|Regular season

|-
!colspan=9 style=|Big 12 Tournament

|-
!colspan=9 style=|NIT

|-

|-

Rankings

*AP does not release post-NCAA Tournament rankings^Coaches did not release a Week 2 poll.

References

2018–19 Big 12 Conference men's basketball season
2018
2018 in sports in Texas
2019 in sports in Texas
2019 National Invitation Tournament participants
2018-19 Texas Longhorns